Chris Waterson (born 27 December 1969) is a former Australian rules footballer who played with Fitzroy in the Australian Football League (AFL).

Waterson, a recruit from Cohuna, played nine senior games for Fitzroy in the 1990 AFL season and another four in the 1991 season. He selected with the 17th pick of the 1987 National Draft.

References

External links
 
 

1969 births
Australian rules footballers from Victoria (Australia)
Fitzroy Football Club players
Living people